ASET, the Work based and Placement Learning Association, was established in 1982, and is now the leading professional body for placement and employability staff in UK Higher Education Providers (HEPs). ASET is a registered charity based in Sheffield, England, run by, and for, work based learning practitioners offering support, advice, guidance and representation to all professionals who work in the field. ASET seeks to advance the prevalence, effectiveness and quality of work based and placement learning in Higher Education, by promoting and publishing research.

ASET aims to:

 Provide strategic leadership and a national voice as a central agency
 Champion the concept of work based and placement learning
 Advise on best practice, providing training and staff development opportunities for the dissemination of good practice across the sector
 Offer informed and authoritative representation, advice and support to all professionals working in the field
 Provide a forum for groups and individuals to discuss and formulate policies
 Prepare, develop and publish information and research relating to work based and placement learning 

ASET provides training for over 1500 staff managing all forms of work placements through a regular staff development programme of workshops and an annual conference held in early September 2019. ASET has provided leadership in the development of Good Practice Guides in many areas including Health and Safety for Student Placements and Supporting Students with Disabilities on Placement and also the promotion and dissemination of a series of ASET Viewpoints on topical issues.

References

External links
 Official Website The Placement and Employability Professionals' Body
 Guardian Newspaper Article A Guardian newspaper article about ASET and its work.

Career advice services
Education in Sheffield
Graduate recruitment
Higher education organisations based in the United Kingdom
Organisations based in Sheffield
Teacher associations based in the United Kingdom